Muzaffarnagar railway station is a station on the Northern Railway network. It comes under Delhi Division of Northern Railway. And provide connectivity to major cities of India mainly Delhi, Chennai, Mumbai, Lucknow etc.
It is an important station on the – line. It is almost in the mid of the entire route. It also lies on the main route of  Northern freight corridor. Almost all the freight of Uttrakhand passes through here.

History

Work of doubling of Meerut–Muzaffarnagar–Saharanpur tracks was completed from 2015 to 2016.

Trains
Some of the important trains that pass through Muzaffarnagar are:
 18237/38 Chhattisgarh Express
 12205/06 Dehradun AC Express
 12904/04 Golden Temple Mail
 12055/56 Dehradun Jan Shatabdi Express
 12017/18 Dehradun Shatabdi Express
 14511/12 Nauchandi Express
 19019/20 Bandra Terminus–Dehradun Express
 19325/26 Indore–Amritsar Express
 14309/10 Ujjaini Express
 12687/88 Madurai–Dehradun Express
 14681/82 Jalandhar City–New Delhi Intercity Express
 14521/22 Delhi–Ambala Cantonment Intercity Express
 14646/45 Shalimar Express
 04401/02 Anand Vihar Terminal–Udhampur Superfast Express
 12205/06 Nanda Devi AC Express
 19031/32 Yoga Express
 22659/60 Kochuveli–Dehradun Superfast Express
 19565/66 Uttaranchal Express
 12911/12 Valsad–Haridwar Superfast Express
 22917/18 Bandra Terminus–Haridwar Express
 18477/78 Kalinga Utkal Express
There are one Shatabdi Express, one Jan Shatabadi Express, one AC Superfast Express, six Superfast Express, fourteen Mail/Express, four MEMU, and four Passenger trains on this route.

Gallery

References

External links
Google.co.in

Muzaffarnagar
Railway stations in Muzaffarnagar district
Railway stations opened in 1870